New Hampshire Route 171 (abbreviated NH 171) is a  east–west highway in southern Carroll County in the Lakes Region of New Hampshire. The highway runs from NH 109 in Moultonborough to NH 16 in Ossipee.

Route description
NH 171 begins at an intersection with NH 109 (Governor John Wentworth Highway) in the town of Moultonborough. The two-lane highway heads east as Mountain Road, which passes along the southern flank of the Ossipee Mountains, including Mount Roberts, Turtleback Mountain, and Mount Shaw, and by the Castle in the Clouds. NH 171 continues through the town of Tuftonboro, where the route crosses the Melvin River and passes to the south of Dan Hole Pond. The highway enters the town of Ossipee at the community of Water Village, the namesake of the highway's name in the town. NH 171 crosses the Beech River in Water Village, then climbs over high ground south of Thompson Hill and intersects NH 28 west of Ossipee Corner, the town center of Ossipee. The highway parallels Poland Brook east of Ossipee Corner and reaches its eastern terminus at NH 16 (White Mountain Highway) just north of that highway's crossing of Poland Brook.

Major intersections

References

External links

 New Hampshire State Route 171 on Flickr

171
Transportation in Carroll County, New Hampshire